ALGOL Y was the name given to a speculated successor for the ALGOL 60 programming language that incorporated some radical features that were rejected for ALGOL 68 and ALGOL X. ALGOL Y was intended to be a "radical reconstruction" of ALGOL.

One such feature was the possibility to construct new proc mode's at run-time, which was criticized as the "ability to modify its own programs at run time" while, on the other hand, it would have brought ALGOL Y to the same level of expressiveness as LISP.

"Initially the proposal for an update to Algol was Algol X, with Algol Y being the name reserved for
the corresponding metalanguage. Van Wijngaarden produced a paper for the 1963 IFIP programming language
committee, entitled “Generalized Algol,” which contained the basic concepts which were eventually
incorporated into Algol 68."

See also
ALGOL 60
ALGOL 68

References
 http://archive.computerhistory.org/resources/text/algol/ACM_Algol_bulletin/1061688/p8-de_morgan.pdf
 ALGOL X and ALGOL Y - Lambert Meertens - CWI Lectures in honour of Adriaan van Wijngaarden - November 2016

Algol programming language family